Jesús Manuel Ramos García (April 12, 1918 – September 2, 1977) was an outfielder/first baseman in Major League Baseball who played briefly during the  season. Listed at 5' 10.5", 167 lb., Ramos batted right-handed and threw left-handed. Born in Maturín, Venezuela, he played under the name Chucho Ramos.

Career
Ramos became the third player to go straight into the major leagues with no minor league experience, following Ted Lyons and Alex Carrasquel. He also was the second Venezuelan player to appear in a major league game, behind fellow countryman Carrasquel.

Ramos was heralded as an outstanding defensive player, but back problems shortened his career. He made his majors debut on May 7, 1944 in the National League with the Cincinnati Reds, and went 3-for-4 off Max Lanier of the St. Louis Cardinals. In his brief stint with Cincinnati, Ramos went 5-for-10 for a .500 batting average in four games, including a double and one run.

Resuming his career, Ramos played during 12 seasons (1946–1955) for the Magallanes team of the Venezuelan Baseball League, hitting .271 with 12 home runs and 162 RBI.

Ramos died of respiratory failure in Caracas, Venezuela, at age of 59.

See also
 List of players from Venezuela in Major League Baseball

Sources

Baseball Almanac
Retrosheet
Liga Chucho Ramos (in Spanish)

1918 births
1977 deaths
Cincinnati Reds players
Deaths from respiratory failure
Major League Baseball outfielders
Major League Baseball players from Venezuela
Navegantes del Magallanes players
People from Maturín
Syracuse Chiefs players
Venezuelan expatriate baseball players in the United States